AGJ may refer to:

 Alfred Garth Jones (1872–1955), English artist and illustrator
 Aguni Airport (IATA code AGJ)
 Argobba language (ISO-639-3 code agj)
 Attorney General of Jamaica